Antinori is an Italian surname. Notable people with the surname include:

Ignacio Antinori (1885–1940), Italian-born American mobster
Luigi Antinori, 18th century singer
Orazio Antinori (1811-1882), Italian explorer and zoologist
Severino Antinori (born 1945), Italian gynecologist and embryologist
Vincenzo Antinori (1792–1865), Italian science administrator

Italian-language surnames